Václav Winter (7 September 1924 – 20 March 2009) was a Czech middle-distance runner. He competed in the men's 800 metres at the 1948 Summer Olympics.

References

1924 births
2009 deaths
Athletes (track and field) at the 1948 Summer Olympics
Czech male middle-distance runners
Olympic athletes of Czechoslovakia
Place of birth missing